In mathematics, the Halpern–Läuchli theorem is a partition result about finite products of infinite trees. Its original purpose was to give a model for set theory in which the Boolean prime ideal theorem is true but the axiom of choice is false. It is often called the Halpern–Läuchli theorem, but the proper attribution for the theorem as it is formulated below is to Halpern–Läuchli–Laver–Pincus or HLLP (named after James D. Halpern, Hans Läuchli, Richard Laver, and David Pincus), following .

Let d,r < ω,  be a sequence of finitely splitting trees of height ω. Let 

then there exists a sequence of subtrees  strongly embedded in  such that

Alternatively, let

 

and

 .

The HLLP theorem says that not only is the collection  partition regular for each d < ω, but that the homogeneous subtree guaranteed by the theorem is strongly embedded in

References

Ramsey theory
Theorems in the foundations of mathematics
Trees (set theory)